District 38 of the Georgia Senate is a senatorial district that encompasses parts of Midwestern Georgia encompassing  part of Atlanta and Fulton County, Georgia.  The current senator is Horacena Tate.

District officeholders

References

Government of Georgia (U.S. state)
Georgia Senate districts